Amit Vilasrao Deshmukh (born 21 March 1976) is an Indian politician and a member of Indian National Congress. He is the son of veteran congress leader Vilasrao Deshmukh. He is a three term Member of the Maharashtra Legislative Assembly from the Latur city constituency. He is the National Secretary of the All India Congress Committee. In 2014, he was appointed Minister of State for Tourism, Food & Drugs Administration, Excise, and New Renewable Energy.

Early life 
Deshmukh was born on 21 March 1976 to Vilasrao Deshmukh. He is also the elder brother of actor Ritesh Deshmukh and Dhiraj Deshmukh.

Political career 
Son of a politician, Amit Deshmukh entered the Maharashtra political scene at a young age. Working from the grassroots, he actively participated in the 1997 Latur Nagar Parishad elections at the age of 21, and was involved in the campaigning for Shivraj Patil in the 1999 Lok Sabha elections.

He has been the vice-president of the Youth Congress in the years 2002 and 2008. In 2009, Amit Deshmukh contested from Latur city on a Congress ticket and defeated Kayyum Khan Mohammad Khan Pathan of Bahujan Samaj Party, and Shripad Kulkarni of Shiv Sena by a margin of 89,480 votes. It was the fourth largest victory in Maharashtra.

In December 2019, Deshmukh took oath as a cabinet minister in the 2019 Maharashtra Legislative Assembly.

He is the guardian minister of Latur district.

Personal life 
He is married to actress Aditi Pratap.

Positions held 
 2009– present     - Member of Legislative Assembly, Maharashtra.
 2014- 2014        - Minister of State, Govt of Maharashtra
 2014– present     - National Secretary of the All India Congress Committee
 2019–2022     - Cabinet Minister, Govt of Maharashtra

References

Living people
1976 births
People from Latur
Maharashtra MLAs 2009–2014
Maharashtra MLAs 2014–2019
Indian National Congress politicians from Maharashtra